Delta Andromedae, Latinized from δ Andromedae, is a triple star system in the northern constellation of Andromeda. The system is visible to the naked eye as a point of light with a combined apparent visual magnitude of 3.28. The system is drifting closer with a radial velocity of −10 km/s.

Apart from its Bayer designation, it was also given the title Delta by Elijah H. Burritt in his star atlas.

This is a long-period spectroscopic binary with an orbital period of approximately 15,000 days (41 years). The primary of the spectroscopic binary, component Aa, has a stellar classification of K3 III, indicating that it is an aging giant star. It most likely evolved from a F-type main sequence star after consuming the hydrogen at its core. The secondary, component Ab, is a relatively faint K-type dwarf, which has been imaged using a stellar coronagraph. The system has two companions, the closest of which is most likely an orbiting red dwarf of class M3 with a separation of at least 900 astronomical units.

An excess of infrared emission from δ Andromedae suggested that it may be surrounded by a shell of dust. In 2003 it was determined that this is more likely a circumstellar debris disk.

References

External links
 The Constellation Andromeda: The Chained Maiden , web page, European Southern Observatory outreach.
 Image Delta Andromedae

K-type giants
K-type main-sequence stars
M-type main-sequence stars
Spectroscopic binaries
Triple stars

Andromeda (constellation)
Andromedae, Delta
BD+30 0091
Andromedae, 31
003627
003092
0165